Knivskjellodden or Knivskjelodden is a peninsula located in Nordkapp Municipality in Troms og Finnmark county, Norway. It is the northernmost point on the island of Magerøya in Northern Norway. It is sometimes considered the northernmost point of the entire continent of Europe. The nearby Kinnarodden on the Nordkinn Peninsula is the northernmost point on the mainland. The northernmost point of the country Norway is in fact Rossøya, in Svalbard, as far north as 80°N.

The North Cape tourist facility is located on 300 meter altitude and gives good view in good weather, but is often located above the cloud base, giving fog there. On Knivskjellodden hikers can walk to the shore which is at sea level and at least see the ocean, and usually a view far out below the clouds.

Travel agencies that organize trips for unaware tourists often advertise the North Cape as the northern extremity of Europe, but this is not true as the Knivskjellodden is  further north.

See also
Lindesnes, southernmost point in Norway
Extreme points of Europe

References

External links
 Jan S. Krogh's Geosite: On Knivskjellodden and North Cape

Headlands of Norway
Peninsulas of Troms og Finnmark
Extreme points of Earth
Nordkapp
Landforms of Troms og Finnmark